The Duke City Shootout is the world's first and longest-running script-to-screen movie-making contest. The Shootout and the 48 Hour Film Project were cited in MovieMaker Magazine as "pioneers of the marathon movie-making competition." The competition was begun in 2000 in Albuquerque, New Mexico, under the name Flicks on 66, and briefly changed to DigiFest Southwest, before settling on the current name.

Each year, the Shootout conducts an international competition for short scripts, 12 minutes or shorter, and selects seven to produce during the competition, held annually in July. Selected competitors are brought to Albuquerque and have one week to shoot, edit and premiere their finished movie.

The festival provides equipment, crews, cast, locations, editing facilities, mentors and everything necessary for the competitors to complete their movies. The movies are screened before a live audience on the final night of the event.

The Shootout has also incorporated other movie-making contests since its inception. In 2006 and 2007, it partnered with the 48 Hour Film Project and hosted its own MiniCini to help aspiring filmmakers create nearly 50 additional shorts during the week.

See also
48 Hour Film Project
National Film Challenge
List of timed artistic contests
List of film festivals

References

External links
 Official web site

Film festivals in New Mexico
Short film festivals in the United States
Film competitions